Do Chahi-ye Bala (also Romanized as Do Chāhī-ye Bālā) is a village in Jangal Rural District, Jangal District, Roshtkhar County, Razavi Khorasan Province, Iran. At the 2006 census, its population was 198, in 39 families.

References 

Populated places in Roshtkhar County